Hum Do Hamare Do is a 2021 Indian Hindi-language comedy film directed by Abhishek Jain and produced by Dinesh Vijan. The film stars Rajkummar Rao, Kriti Sanon, Paresh Rawal and Ratna Pathak Shah. Aparshakti Khurana, Manu Rishi, Prachee Shah Paandya and Saanand Verma play supporting roles.

The film was officially announced in February 2020 with Rao, Sanon, Rawal and Dimple Kapadia in lead roles. Later after the production was deferred due to COVID-19 pandemic, Kapadia quit the film and was replaced by Pathak Shah. After being postponed for over six months due to the pandemic, the Principal photography finally begun on 30 October 2020 in Chandigarh.

Initially slated for theatrical release, the decision was later dropped due to the second wave of the pandemic. Then it was directly released online on Disney+ Hotstar on 29 October 2021.

Plot
Dhruv Shikhar is an orphan who used to work in the "Purshottam's Dhaba". After some years, he became an entrepreneur who falls in love with Aanya Mehra whom he first met on his Virtual reality app launch event. They soon become friends and meet a certain number of times. He learns that she would like to marry a guy with a sweet family and an adopted dog. He also finds that her parents, Anand Mehra and Yamini Mehra, died in a theatre fire when she was seven years old and she lives with her aunt, Roopa Mehra and uncle, Dr. Sanjeev Mehra.

With the help of his bestfriend Shunty and Shaadiram, he unsuccessfully attempted to find fake parents to make a perfect family for Anya. He then recalled about Purshottam who had gone to live in an old age home in some other city and went to find him. The attempt of making Purshottam as his fake father failed but somebody told him about his first and the last love of his life, Deepti Kashyap, whom because of his lack of confidence he failed to elope with. After a few attempts of persuading her to accept the offer, she finally agreed to act as his fake mother after Shunty reminded her of the small boy who she met in a dhaba. Purshottam also agreed to act as his father because of Deepti.

Soon they meet Aanya's parents and with few lies in attempting to make it look like a true family, their marriage is fixed. Unfortunately because of an accidental reveal of Dhruv being an orphan and his fake family, Aanya's family cancels the marriage on the sangeet day. After the failed attempt of marriage Aanya's parents fix her wedding with somebody else, on the other hand because of living together for so long Purshottam, Deepti and Dhruv start living as a real family. Seeing Dhruv's sorrow, his parents - Purshottam and Deepti went to apologize to Mehra family and find out about her wedding. But Dr. Sanjeev Mehra humiliates both of them. Dhruv learns of this, and tells his parents to forget about Aanya. In the end, it is because of Aanya's younger sister Kanika, that she understands that Dhruv is the right match for her, as he took the trouble of creating a whole family, simply for her. She goes to him, proposes, he finally agrees and they marry.

Cast
 Rajkummar Rao as Dhruv Shikhar / Chotu / Jaadugar Goga / Balpremi
 Kriti Sanon as Aanya Mehra
 Paresh Rawal as Purushottam Mishra
 Ratna Pathak Shah as Deepti Kashyap
 Aparshakti Khurana as Sandeep "Shunty" Sachdeva
 Manu Rishi as Dr. Sanjeev Mehra
 Prachi Shah as Roopa Mehra
 Mazel Vyas as Kanika Mehra
 Saanand Verma as Joginder "Shaadiram" Arora
 Avijit Dutt as Jagmohan Diwan
 Shibani Bedi as Tara Sachdeva
 Himanshu Sharma as Rabban

Reception

Critical response
The film received mixed to negative reviews. Saibal Chatterjee of NDTV gave the film 1.5 stars out of 5 and wrote, "Rajkummar Rao is saddled with the task of salvaging a poorly written protagonist whose impulses, compulsions and decisions border on the inexplicable." Shubham Kulkarni, Author at Koimoi gave 2.5 stars out of 5 and wrote, "It's a reminder of why we need to bring back the veterans and give them characters they can blow." Prathyush Parasuraman of Firstpost gave a rating of 3/5 and wrote," Hum Do Hamare Do holds weak foundations with lazy character detailing but is saved by a better second-half." Shubhra Gupta of The Indian Express gave 1.5 stars and wrote, "The only ones who occasionally make feeble attempts to rise above this muddle are Ratna Pathak Shah and Paresh Rawal, and should have been given more to do." Stutee Ghosh from The Quint gave 2.5 stars and said, "For a film that couldn't make the man do the obvious thing and speak up, the makers manage to regurgitate every other trope to make the story move along." Hiren Kotwani of The Times of India gave 3 stars out of 5 and wrote, "Hum Do Hamare Do is a decent watch… but if only the second half had been more engaging with a few dollops more of humour." Sukanya Verma from Rediff.com gave 2 stars and said, "Hum Do Hamare Do is the kind of rush job rom-com that cuts to the chase after so much dillydallying and in such a dull manner, it completely misses the point." Nayandeep Rakshit from Bollywood Bubble gave 3.5 stars out of 5 and wrote, "The movie has the perfect blend of the navras – you smile, you laugh, you enjoy and you cry, all along with them. The songs are beautifully positioned although they aren’t the highlight of the film." Himesh Mankad of Pinkvilla gave the film 2.5 stars out of 5 and wrote, "Hum Do Hamare Do is made with the right intent, however, the premise had the potential of more humour through the narrative and required a rather nuanced approach in terms of emotions in the last 25 minutes." Bollywood Hungama gave 2.5 stars and stated,"Hum Do Hamare Do rests on a great plot and fine performances but the average script and weak climax diminishes the impact."

Soundtrack 

The film's music was composed by Sachin–Jigar while the lyrics were written by Shellee.

References

External links 
 
 Hum Do Hamare Do at Bollywood Hungama

Disney+ Hotstar original films
Indian direct-to-video films
2021 films
Films shot in Chandigarh
Indian comedy-drama films
2020s Hindi-language films
2021 comedy-drama films